Hergiswil Matt railway station is a Swiss railway station in the municipality of Hergiswil in the canton of Nidwalden. It is on the Brünig line of the Zentralbahn railway company, which links Lucerne and Interlaken, and is also used by trains of the Luzern–Stans–Engelberg line.

Services 
The following services stop at Hergiswil Matt:

References

External links 
 

Railway stations in the canton of Nidwalden
Hergiswil
Zentralbahn stations